Irish Wish is an upcoming American fantasy romantic comedy film directed by Janeen Damian from a screenplay by Kirsten Hansen. The film stars Lindsay Lohan and marks her second consecutive project with Netflix and the Damians. Brad Krevoy and Michael Damian serve as producers on the film, which was officially announced in September 2022 and began production in Ireland that same month. It is scheduled to be released in 2024 by Netflix.

Premise
When the love of her life gets engaged to her best-friend, Maddie puts her feelings aside to be a bridesmaid at their wedding in Ireland. Days before the pair are set to marry, Maddie makes a spontaneous wish for true love, only to wake up as the bride-to-be. With her dream seeming to come true, Maddie soon realizes that her real soulmate is someone else entirely.

Cast
 Lindsay Lohan as Maddie
 Ed Speleers
 Alexander Vlahos
 Ayesha Curry
 Elizabeth Tan
 Jane Seymour
 Dakota Lohan

Production
After returning to acting with the holiday romcom Falling for Christmas, Netflix announced in March 2022 that they would continue to work with Lindsay Lohan through a partnership where she would star in two new films. In May 2022, Lohan talked to Forbes about the deal:

In August 2022, local media reported Lohan would be filming a new movie titled Irish Wish in multiple locations across Ireland the following month. Set in modern day Ireland, Lohan would be playing the lead role and the movie was expected to be released on Netflix in the following year. A casting call for a body double from the production company then revealed principal photography for the film would be taking place in Dublin, Wicklow and Westport, from September 5 to October 14, 2022. On September 1, 2022, Netflix officially announced the movie as part of their two-picture creative partnership with Lohan, and revealed its premise. Irish Wish sees Lohan reteaming with filmmaker Janeen Damian, who she previously worked with on Falling for Christmas. Damian was set to direct the screenplay, which was written by Kirsten Hansen. Motion Picture Corporation of America's Brad Krevoy and Riviera Films' Michael Damian would be producing, while Hansen, Amanda Phillips, Jimmy Townsend and Vince Balzano served as executive producers. On September 14, it was announced that Ed Speleers, Alexander Vlahos, Ayesha Curry, Elizabeth Tan and Jane Seymour had joined the cast. In November 2022, Seymour revealed on The Late Late Show she would be playing Lohan's character's mother in the film.

Lohan talked about her character saying: "She's a bit of a bookworm. She's a nerd, which I loved playing. But she's a sweetheart. She's kind of naive, and she keeps it that way because her head is always focused on writing and stuff," and revealed her brother Dakota would also be appearing in Irish Wish. Later that month, Michael and Janeen Damian said they had begun the editing process. They stated Lohan would be doing more physical comedy in the film and did some of her own stunts. Damian said the film "takes place in the summer, it's a love letter to Ireland. It has a lot of really fun physical comedy but also a lot of heart and a little bit of magic [...] Because we had worked together on Falling For Christmas we really could play to [Lohan's] strengths when we were putting this project together." He continued, "It's a 'be careful what you wish for' story. Sometimes you may not get what you want but you get what you need."

Release
The film is scheduled to be released in 2024 on Netflix.

References

External links
 

2023 films
2023 romantic comedy films
2020s American films
2020s English-language films
2020s fantasy comedy films
2020s romantic fantasy films
American fantasy comedy films
American romantic comedy films
American romantic fantasy films
English-language Netflix original films
Films about weddings
Films about wish fulfillment
Films set in Ireland
Films shot in Ireland
Upcoming English-language films
Upcoming films
Upcoming Netflix original films